Lauvsnes is the administrative centre of the municipality of Flatanger in Trøndelag county, Norway. Lauvsnes has some small industry as well as fish farming. The island of Løvøya lies just north of the village.

2006 flood
In January 2006, parts of Lauvsnes were hit by a flood on the river Lauvsneselva, which passes through a dam on its way to the village. The water flowed over the dam from the Lauvsnes lake and rushed down river. A house was carried by the flood and swept into the sea. Two bridges in the village were destroyed. The water and sewer system was damaged, as was the community center. Some people were evacuated from their homes and television footage from the crisis was seen all over Norway.

References

Villages in Trøndelag
Flatanger